Tommy Lee Jones is an American Actor known for his performances in television and film. 

Jones received various accolades including an Academy Award, a Golden Globe Award, a Primetime Emmy Award and two Screen Actors Guild Awards. He won the Academy Award for Best Supporting Actor for his role in the thriller The Fugitive (1993). His other Oscar-nominated roles were in JFK (1991), In the Valley of Elah (2007), and Lincoln (2012). He also received two Primetime Emmy Award nominations winning the Primetime Emmy Award for Outstanding Lead Actor in a Limited or Anthology Series or Movie for his performance as Gary Gilmore in The Executioner's Song (1992).

He received honorary awards including a star on the Hollywood Walk of Fame in 1994. He also received the Santa Barbara International Film Festival Award, American Riviera Award in 2007 and the San Sebastian International Film Festival Lifetime Achievement Award in 2012.

Major associations

Academy Awards

BAFTA Awards

Golden Globe Awards

Emmy Awards

Screen Actors Guild Awards

Miscellaneous awards

References

External links
 

Jones, Tommy Lee